Dargu or Dargoo may refer to:
 Dargu Shomali